The following is an incomplete list of historical dynasties which were at some time Iranian or the country they ruled were Iranian-speaking and of modern countries with significant Iranian populations or with an official Iranian language. The Iranians consist of Persians, Medes, Scythians, Kurds, Bactrians, Pashtuns, Tajiks, Baloch, Parthians, Sogdians, Sarmatians, Alans, Ossetians, along with others.

Current states

Independent states 
  Iran 

 Afghanistan
  (de facto)
  (de jure)

  Tajikistan

  South Ossetia (de facto) in Georgia

Federal subjects of Russia 
  North Ossetia–Alania

Autonomous regions 
  Taxkorgan Tajik Autonomous County in China

  Kurdistan Region in Iraq

  Rojava in Syria

  Gorno-Badakhshan Autonomous Region in Tajikistan

Historical confederation of tribes and Iranian dynasties 
 Alans
 Sogdians
 Scythians
 Xionites
 Dahae
 Parthians
 Sarmatians
 Saka
 Medes
 Daylamites
 The Pahlavas
 Massagetaeans
 Khwarezmians
 Roxolani
 Siraces
 Iazyges

Direct Iranian dynasties 
 Scythian kingdoms
 Scythian Kingdom in West Asia (c. 7th century BC–c. 600s BC)
 Scythian Kingdom in Pontic Steppe (c. 600s BC–c. 3rd century BC)
 Median dynasty (ca. 678 BCE–549 BCE) of Median origin
 Orontid dynasty (570–200 BC) of Iranian origin
 Pharnacid dynasty (c. 550–320 BC) of Persian origin
 Achaemenid dynasty (550–330 BC) of Persian origin
 Ariarathid dynasty (331 BC–96 BC) of Iranian origin
 Atropatene (320s BC–3rd century AD) of Iranian origin
 Parthian Empire ("Arsacid dynasty of Parthia"; 247 BC–224 AD) of Parthian origin
 Arsacid dynasty of Armenia (52–428) of Parthian origin
 Arsacid dynasty of Iberia (c. 189–284) of Parthian origin
 Arsacid dynasty of Caucasian Albania (1st century–510) of Parthian origin
 Indo-Scythians (200 BCE–400 AD) of Scythian origin
 Shule Kingdom (200 BC–790 AD) of Iranian origin
 Artaxiad dynasty (190 BC–12 AD) of Iranian origin
 Indo-Parthian Kingdom (12 BC–before 100 AD?) of Parthian origin
 Kingdom of Khotan (56–1006) of Sakan origin
 Sasanian dynasty (224–651) of Persian origin
 House of Kayus (226-380) of Iranian origin
 Chosroid dynasty (284–807) of Iranian origin
 Afrighids (305–995) of Khwarezmian origin
 Kingdom of the Alans (409–426) of Alan origin
 Mihranids (330–821) of Parthian origin
 Dabuyid dynasty (642–760) of Iranian origin
 Masmughans of Damavand (650–760) of Parthian origin
 Bavand dynasty (651–1349) of Parthian origin
 Paduspanids (665–1598) of Iranian origin 
 Bukhar Khudahs (before 681–890s) of Sogdian origin
 Principality of Ushrusana (?–892/3) of Sogdian origin
 Qarinvand dynasty (7th-century–11th-century) of Parthian origin
 Rustamid dynasty (767–909) of Persian origin
 Sadakiyans (770–828) of Kurdish origin
 Justanids (791–974) of Iranian origin
 Samanids (819–999) of Iranian origin
 Tahirid dynasty (821–873) of Persian origin
 Banijurids (848–908) of Iranian origin
 Saffarid dynasty (861–1003) of Persian origin
 Ghurid dynasty (before 879–1219) of Iranian origin
 Qarmatians (899–1077) of Iranian origin
 Alania (late 9th century–1238/1239) of Alan origin
 Sajid dynasty (889/890–929) of Sogdian origin
 Farighunids (9th century-1010) of Persian origin
 Sallarid dynasty (919–1062) of Daylamite origin
 Ziyarid dynasty (931–1090) of Gilaki origin
 Banu Ilyas (932–968) of Sogdian origin
 Buyid dynasty (934–1062) of Daylamite origin
 Hasanwayhids (950–1121) of Kurdish origin
 Shaddadids (951–1199) of Kurdish origin
 Rawadids (955–1116) Originally of Arab origin, but later Kurdicized.
 Marwanids (983/990–1085) of Kurdish origin
 Annazids (990–1116) of Kurdish origin
 Ma'munids (995–1017) of Iranian origin
 Kakuyids (1008–1141) of Daylamite origin
 Nasrid dynasty (Sistan) (1029–1225) of Iranian origin
 Principality of Eğil (1049–1864) of Kurdish origin
 Hazaraspids (1115–1424) of Kurdish origin
 Atabegs of Yazd (1141–1319) of Persian origin
 Khorshidi dynasty (1184–1597) of Kurdish origin
 Ayyubid dynasty (1171–1260/1341) of Kurdish origin
 Principality of Bitlis (1182–1847) of Kurdish origin
 Emirate of Hasankeyf (1232–1524) of Kurdish origin
 Kurt Dynasty (1244–1381) of Tajik origin
 Pervâneoğlu (1261-1326) of Persian origin
 Zirqanids (1335-1835) of Kurdish origin
 Afrasiab dynasty (1349–1504) of Iranian origin
 Marashis (1359–1596) of Mazandarani origin
 Lodi dynasty (1451–1526) of Pashtun origin
 Mirani dynasty (1476–1787) of Baloch origin
 Emirate of Palu (1495–1850) of Kurdish origin
 Safavid dynasty (1501-1736) It was an Iranian dynasty of Kurdish origin, but later on they began to speak Turkic and became Turkified. However, they still ruled as an Iranian empire. and reasserted the Iranian identity of the region. what is certain, that the Safavids were of native Iranian stock and spoke the Azerbaijani language. Encyclopædia Iranica, described the Safavids as follows ; "As Persians of Kurdish ancestry and of a non-tribal background, the Safavids...". (described them as Persians of Kurdish origin.)
 Emirate of Bradost (1510–1609) of Kurdish origin
 Soran Emirate (1514–1836) of Kurdish origin
 Sur Empire (1540–1556) of Pashtun origin
 Ardalan (14th century–1865/1868) of Kurdish origin
 Baban (1649–1850) of Kurdish origin
 Karrani Dynasty (1564–1576) of Pashtun origin
 Hotaki dynasty (1709–1738) of Pashtun origin
 Nawab of Awadh (1732–1856) of Persian origin
 Talysh Khanate (1747–1826) of Talysh origin
 Sarab Khanate (1747–?) of Kurdish origin
 Durrani Empire (1747–1862) of Pashtun origin
 Zand dynasty (1750–1794) of Iranian origin
 Talpur dynasty (1783–1843) of Baloch origin
 Emirate of Herat (1793–1863) of Pashtun origin
 Barakzai dynasty (1826–1973) of Pashtun origin
 Pahlavi dynasty (1925–1979) of paternally Mazandarani origin

Sinicized Iranian dynasties 
 Yan dynasty (756-764) of Sogdian and Göktürk origin

Turkified Iranian dynasties 
 Khoy Khanate (1210-1799) The Khanate was ruled by the Donboli, a Turkified Kurdish tribe.
 Tabriz Khanate (1757–1799) Was a Caucasian Khanate from centered around Tabriz and led by members of the Turkified Kurdish Donboli tribe.

Hellenized Iranian dynasties 

 Mithridatic dynasty (281 BC – 62 AD) The Mithridatic dynasty was a dynasty of Persian origin, that ruled the Hellenistic kingdom of Pontus.

Former and defunct Iranian governments 
  Kurdish state (1918-1919) (1918-1921)
  Persian Socialist Soviet Republic (1920–1921)
  Autonomous Government of Khorasan (1921)
  Kingdom of Kurdistan (1921–1924/1925)
  South Ossetian Autonomous Oblast (1922–1990)
  Kurdistansky Uyezd (1923–1929)
  Republic of Ararat (1927–1931)
  Tajik Soviet Socialist Republic (1929–1991)
  Kurdistan okrug (1930)
  North Ossetian Autonomous Soviet Socialist Republic (1936–1992)
  Republic of Mahabad (1946–1947)
  Baluchistan States Union (1952-1955)
  Republic of Laçin (1992)
  Talysh-Mughan Autonomous Republic (1993)
  Islamic Emirate of Byara (2001-2003)
  Islamic Emirate of Kunar (1991)
  Islamic Emirate of Badakhshan (1996)

See also 
 Iranian peoples
 Iranian languages
 Nomadic empire
 List of Kurdish dynasties and countries
 List of Pashtun empires and dynasties

Further reading 

 Kamrava, Mehran (2022). A Dynastic History of Iran: From the Qajars to the Pahlavis. Cambridge University Press.

References 

Lists of former countries
Former countries in Asia
Former countries in Central Asia
Former countries in the Middle East
Former countries in Europe
Lists of ethnic groups
Europe-related lists
Asia-related lists
 
Lists of dynasties
Country classifications
Central Asia
South Asia
Western Asia
Eurasia